Dennis Neal Matthews (born 16 July 1943) is a former New Zealand cricketer.

Matthews was born in Paeroa, and played five first-class matches for Northern Districts in the Plunket Shield in the 1963–64 season. He also played for Thames Valley in the Hawke Cup. A leg-spin bowler, he was given a trial in advance of New Zealand's tour of India, Pakistan and England in 1965 but was not selected, and played no more major cricket after the 1964–65 season.

References

External links 
 
 Dennis Matthews at CricketArchive

1943 births
Living people
New Zealand cricketers
Northern Districts cricketers
People from Paeroa
Cricketers from Waikato